Ubaté (originally Villa San Diego de Ubaté) is a town and municipality in the Ubaté Province, part of Cundinamarca Department, Colombia. Ubaté is the capital of the province with the same name and situated in the Ubaté–Chiquinquirá Valley of the Altiplano Cundiboyacense. The province borders the department of Boyacá in the north, the Rionegro Province in the west, the Central Savanna Province in the south and in the east and southeast the Almeidas Province.

Etymology 
The name Ubaté comes from the native name "Ebate" meaning "Bloodied land" or "Sower of the mouth".

History 
The area of Ubaté before the Spanish conquest was inhabited by the Muisca, organised in a loose confederation of rulers called the Muisca Confederation. Initially loyal to the zaque of Hunza, Ubaté changed rule around 1490 when it was submitted by zipa Saguamanchica.

Modern Ubaté was founded on April 12, 1592, by Bernardo de Albornoz.

It is known as the "Milk Capital of Colombia", for a Gothic style cathedral and the San Luis Convent.

Economy 
The main activities of Ubaté are agriculture and livestock farming.

Gallery

References

Bibliography 

 

Municipalities of Cundinamarca Department
Populated places established in 1592
1592 establishments in the Spanish Empire
Muisca Confederation
Muysccubun